Another Sunny Day is a 2017 Namibian short film directed by Tim Huebschle and co-produced by director himself along with Haiko Boldt. The film stars Paulus Johannes and his life as a person living with albinism in one of the hottest parts of Namibia. The film made its premiere on August 4, 2017 at the Jozi Film Festival Discovery Channel Don't Stop Wondering, Johannesburg, South Africa.

The film was screened at the Cannes Film Festival on Disability in 2017 and received positive acclaim from critics.

Cast
 Paulus Johannes

References

External links 
 

Namibian short films
Namibian drama films
2017 drama films
2017 short films
Albinism